Manuel Alfonso was a Cuban baseball first baseman and outfielder in the Cuban League. He played from 1897 to 1907 with several teams, including Almendares, Azul, and Habana.

References

External links

Azul (baseball) players
Almendares (baseball) players
Habana players
Cuban baseball players
Cuban League players
Year of birth missing

Year of death missing